Samo Kukovica (born February 2, 1989 in Brežice, SFR Yugoslavia) is a Slovenian motorcycle speedway rider.

References 

1989 births
Living people
Slovenian speedway riders
People from Brežice